Riku Moriyasu (born June 21, 1995) is a Japanese footballer who plays for Tiamo Hirakata. He is a defender.

He signed for Albirex Niigata (S) after graduating from Kyoto Sangyo University.

Club career statistics
As of Jan 2, 2017

References

External links

Living people
1995 births
Japanese footballers
Association football defenders
Albirex Niigata Singapore FC players